Rabiąż  is a village in the administrative district of Gmina Wolin, within Kamień County, West Pomeranian Voivodeship, in northwestern Poland. 

The village has a population of 40.

See also
 History of Pomerania

References

Villages in Kamień County